Rodolfo Luís Costa Miguens Correia, known as Rodolfo (born 6 November 1976) is a Portuguese football coach and a former player. He is currently the manager of Al-Hilal B.

He played 11 seasons and 194 games in the Primeira Liga for Estrela da Amadora, Varzim, Académica de Coimbra, Beira-Mar and Porto.

Club career
He made his Primeira Liga debut for Estrela da Amadora on 30 April 1995 in a game against Porto.

Honours
Porto
Taça de Portugal: 1999–2000
Supertaça Cândido de Oliveira: 1999.

References

External links
 
 

1976 births
Footballers from Lisbon
Living people
Portuguese footballers
C.F. Estrela da Amadora players
Primeira Liga players
FC Porto players
S.C. Beira-Mar players
Varzim S.C. players
Associação Académica de Coimbra – O.A.F. players
Clermont Foot players
Portuguese expatriate footballers
Expatriate footballers in France
Portuguese football managers
Portuguese expatriate football managers
Expatriate football managers in Greece
Expatriate football managers in Brazil
Expatriate football managers in Poland
Expatriate football managers in Iran
Association football midfielders